Qarah Soqol is a village in Oshnavieh-ye Jonubi Rural District, Nalus District, Oshnavieh County, West Azerbaijan Province, Iran. At the 2006 census, its population was 204, in 29 families.

References 

Populated places in Oshnavieh County